Claire Bretécher (17 April 1940 – 10 February 2020) was a French cartoonist, known particularly for her portrayals of women and gender issues. Her creations included Les Frustrés, and the unimpressed teenager Agrippine.

Biography
Bretécher was born in Nantes and got her first break as an illustrator when she was asked to provide the artwork for Le facteur Rhésus by René Goscinny for L'Os à moelle in 1963. She went on to work for several popular magazines and in 1969 invented the character "Cellulite". In 1972 she joined Gotlib and Mandryka in founding the Franco-Belgian comics  magazine L'Écho des savanes.

Throughout the 1970s and 1980s, she published successful collections, such as The Destiny of Monique (1982). In 2001, Bretécher's series Agrippine was adapted into a 26-episode TV series by Canal+.

Claire Bretécher was the widow of French constitutionalist  with whom she had a son.

She died in Paris on 10 February 2020, after suffering for some years from Alzheimer's disease.

Awards
 1975: Best French Author at the Angoulême International Comics Festival, France
 1987: Adamson Award for Best International Comic Book Cartoonist, Sweden
 1999: Humour Award at the Angoulême International Comics Festival
 2002: nominated for the Dialogue Award at the Angoulême International Comics Festival

Bibliography
Les états d'âme de Cellulite (1972, Dargaud), part of the  series
 (1973, Dargaud)
Les angoisses de Cellulite (1974, Glénat), part of the  series
 (1974, Dargaud) 
Les Frustrés (5 albums, 1975–80, Bretecher)
 (1976, Bretecher)
 (1976, Glénat, scénario de Raoul Cauvin)
 (1977, Glénat)
 (1980, Glénat)
 (1980, Bretecher)
 (1982, Bretecher)
 (1983, Bretecher)
 (2 albums 1985–86, Bretecher/Hyphen)
Agrippine (8 albums 1988–2009, Bretecher/Hyphen/Dargaud)
 (1989, Bretecher)
 (1996, Bretecher)
Une Saga génétique (2006, Dargaud)
 (2006, Glénat)
 (2006, Glénat)
 (2006, Glénat, scénario de Hubuc)
Inédits (2007, Dargaud)

Notes

References
 
 Bretécher publications in Pilote, L'Écho des Savanes and Spirou BDoubliées

External links
Claire Bretécher official site  
Claire Bretécher official art gallery 
Claire Bretécher biography on Lambiek Comiclopedia

1940 births
2020 deaths
20th-century French women artists
21st-century French women artists
Artists from Nantes
French cartoonists
French women cartoonists
French comics artists
French comics writers
French female comics artists
Female comics writers
French women writers
Grand Prix de la ville d'Angoulême winners